

Given name
Killick Erik Hinds (born 1972), American musician
Killick Millard (1870–1952), British doctor

Surname
Anthony Killick (1829–1881), English cricketer
Elizabeth Killick (1924–2019), British naval engineer
Ernest Harry "Tim" Killick (1875–1948), English cricketer
Esther Killick (1902–1960), English physiologist
Gordon Killick (1899–1962), British rower
Graeme Killick, Canadian cross country skier
Hammerton Killick (1856-1902), former admiral in the Haitian Navy 
Harry Killick (1837–1877), English cricketer
James Killick (1816-1889) British sea captain, shipowner and entrepreneur
Sir John Killick (1919–2004), British ambassador
Larry Killick (born 1922), American basketball player
Marie Killick (1914–2000), English audio engineer
Paul Killick, British professional ballroom dancer
Tim Killick (born 1958), English  actor
Tom Killick (1907–1953), English cricketer and clergyman
William Killick (1855–1938), English cricketer
Killick (Kent cricketer), English cricketer from the mid-18th century

Fiction
 Preserved Killick, steward to Jack Aubrey throughout the Aubrey–Maturin series of novels by Patrick O'Brian

See also
Killick (disambiguation)

English-language surnames